Greenhill School may refer to:

 Greenhill School (Addison, Texas), a private day school in Addison, Texas 
 Ysgol Greenhill School, a secondary school inf Tenby, Pembrokeshire 
 Greenhill Primary School, Beauchief and Greenhill, Sheffield  
Greenhill Middle School

See also
Greenhills School
Greenhill Academy